Polariffic is a 2014 American animated children's television special produced by Bent Image Lab for Hallmark Channel, directed by Rob Shaw.

Plot
Taking place in the North Pole, "Polariffic" is a story about a foursome of Arctic friends that takes a journey from fear to friendship. Snowby a gentle polar bear, Jaz a be-bopping penguin, Flitter a light-on-her-feet Arctic fox and Cupcake a thoughtful baby seal are the best of friends, until one day they encounter Charlie, a young Yeti who tries to befriend them. At first terrified, the four friends find themselves face-to-face with the Yeti and must muster the courage to trust him in order to save themselves. In the end, the gang learns appearances aren't always what they seem.

Accolades

References